Samuel Johnson (18 September 1709 13 December 1784), the celebrated British man of letters, wrote dozens of essays that defined his views on the politics of his time.

Political writings
Johnson was known as a staunch Tory or was thought not to be active within politics; his political writings were subsequently disregarded and neglected. Boswell's Life of Samuel Johnson is partly to blame. Boswell did not meet Johnson until later in life and was unable to discuss how politics affected Johnson during his early years. Two periods, Robert Walpole's control over British Parliament and the Seven Years' War, were Johnson's most active periods and are the source for much of his early writings. Although Boswell was present with Johnson during the 1770s and described four major pamphlets written by Johnson, he neglected to discuss them because he is more interested in their travels to Scotland. That is compounded by the fact that Boswell held an opinion contradictory to two of the pamphlets, The False Alarm and Taxation No Tyranny, and so he attacked Johnson's views in his biography—including Johnson's attacks on slavery.

Boswell was not the only reason for Johnson to be disregarded as a political thinker. Thomas Babington Macaulay tried to promote the belief that Johnson's political thoughts were nonsensical and the writings of a bigot. However, Macaulay was also a Whig and established the philosophical view that Whigs and Tories were polar opposites, a view that Johnson did not hold. Johnson's views on politics constantly changed through his life, and he early admitted to sympathies for the Jacobite cause, but by the reign of George III, he had come to accept the Hanoverian Succession. It was Boswell who gave people the impression that Johnson was an "arch-conservative", and it was Boswell, more than anyone else, determined how Johnson would be seen by people years later.

Minor pamphlets
The pamphlets played a major role, causing growing tension between America and Britain.

False Alarm
In 1770, he produced The False Alarm, a political pamphlet attacking John Wilkes.

Thoughts Respecting Falkland's Islands
In 1771, his Thoughts on the Late Transactions Respecting Falkland's Islands cautioned against war with Spain.

The Patriot
In 1774, he printed The Patriot, a critique of what he viewed as false patriotism. On the evening of 7 April 1775, he made a famous statement: "Patriotism is the last refuge of the scoundrel." The line was not, as is widely believed, about patriotism in general but rather what Johnson saw as the false use of the term "patriotism" by William Pitt, 1st Earl of Chatham (the patriot minister) and his supporters. Johnson opposed "self-professed patriots" in general but valued what he considered "true" self-professed patriotism.

Taxation No Tyranny

The last of the pamphlets, Taxation No Tyranny (1775), was a defence of the Coercive Acts and a response to the Declaration of Rights of the First Continental Congress of America, which protested against taxation without representation. Johnson argued that by immigrating to America, colonists had "voluntarily resigned the power of voting" but that they still had "virtual representation" in Parliament. In a parody of the Declaration of Rights, Johnson suggested that the Americans had no more right to govern themselves than the Cornish people. If the Americans wanted to participate in Parliament, Johnson said that they could move to England and purchase an estate. Johnson denounced English supporters of America as "traitors to this country" and hoped that the matter would be settled without bloodshed but that it would end with "English superiority and American obedience".

Views
Johnson was a devout conservative Protestant Anglican and believed in a unity between the High Church and the Crown (the State). Johnson respected John Milton's poetry but could not tolerate Milton's Puritan and republican beliefs.

Colonialism
Johnson wrote that the French and Indian War between the French and British colonies of North America was a war between "two robbers" of Native American lands and that neither party deserved to live there. After the signing of the 1783 Treaty of Paris, which marked the American colonists victory over the British, Johnson wrote that he was "deeply disturbed" with the "state of this kingdom".

Scotland
James Boswell, a Scotsman, was a close companion and friend to Johnson during many important times of his life, but Johnson, like many of his fellow Englishmen, had a reputation for despising Scotland and its people. Even during their journey together through Scotland, Johnson "exhibited prejudice and a narrow nationalism". Hester Thrale, in summarising Johnson's nationalistic views and his anti-Scottish prejudice, said, "We all know how well he loved to abuse the Scotch, & indeed to be abused by them in return".

On 6 August 1773, eleven years after first meeting Boswell, Johnson set out to visit his friend in Scotland to begin "a journey to the western islands of Scotland", as Johnson's 1775 account of their travels later put it. The work was intended to discuss the social problems and struggles that affected the Scottish people, but it also praised many of the unique facets of Scottish society, such as a school in Edinburgh for the deaf.

Slavery
He agreed with the Whigs in being an opponent of slavery, unlike most of his fellow Tories, and described it as "an immoral state". That was well before the heyday of the British abolitionist movement, and he once proposed a toast to the "next rebellion of the negroes in the West Indies". He employed a free black manservant, the Jamaican Francis Barber, whom Johnson made his heir.

Notes

References
 .
 .
 .
 .
 .
 .
 .

External links
Taxation No Tyranny (1775)

Politics
Johnson, Samuel